The Maestranza Central de Aviación Triciclo-Experimental (also designated XX-01) was a prototype Chilean light aircraft of the 1940s.

Design and development
In 1947, the Maestranza Central de Aviación, the Central Workshops of the Chilean Air Force designed and built the first Chilean-designed aircraft, the Triciclo-Experimental, unveiled in May 1947. The Triciclo, designed by Alfredo D. Ferrer, was a low-winged monoplane of wooden construction with a fixed tricycle landing gear and a twin tail. The crew of two sat side by side in an enclosed cockpit, and were provided with dual flight controls. A single Franklin air-cooled horizontally-opposed piston engine drove a two-bladed propeller.

Specifications

Notes

References

Triciclo-Experimental
1940s Chilean civil utility aircraft
Single-engined tractor aircraft
Low-wing aircraft
Aircraft first flown in 1947